Khulna Agricultural University is a government-financed public university in Khulna, Bangladesh.

List of vice-chancellors 

 Shahidur Rahman Khan (-present)

Faculties and departments
There are seven faculties in Khulna Agricultural University, which have 51 departments:

Faculty of Veterinary, Animal and Biomedical Sciences
Department of Anatomy and Histology
Department of Physiology
Department of Pharmacology and Toxicology
Department of Microbiology and Public Health
Department of Livestock Production and Management
Department of Pathology
Department of Parasitology
Department of Genetics and Animal Breeding
Department of Dairy Science
Department of Poultry Science
Department of Epidemiology and Preventive Medicine
Department of Animal Nutrition
Department of Medicine
Department of Surgery
Department of Theriogenology

Faculty of Agriculture
Department of Agronomy
Department of Soil Science
Department of Entomology
Department of Horticulture
Department of Plant Pathology
Department of Crop Botany
Department of Plant Genetics and Biotechnology
Department of Agricultural Extension and Information Systems
Department of Agroforestry
Department of Agricultural Chemistry
Department of Biochemistry and Molecular Biology

Faculty of Fisheries and Ocean Sciences
Department of Fishery Biology and Genetics
Department of Aquaculture
Department of Fishery Resources Conservation and Management 
Department of Fisheries Technology and Quality Control
Department of Oceanography
Department of Fish Health Management

Faculty of Agricultural Economics and Agribusiness Studies
Department of Agricultural Economics
Department of Sociology and Rural Development
Department of Agribusiness and Marketing
Department of Agricultural Statistics and Bioinformatics
Department of Agricultural Finance, Co-operative and Banking
Department of Language and Communication Studies

Faculty of Agricultural Engineering and Technology
Department of Farm Structure
Department of Farm Power and Machinery
Department of Irrigation and Water Management
Department of Computer Science and Engineering
Department of Mathematics and Physics

Faculty of Food Sciences and Safety
Department of Food Engineering and Technology
Department of Food Nutrition
Department of Quality Control and Safety Management
Department of Bioprocess Engineering

Faculty of Environment, Disaster Risks and Agro-Climatic Studies
Department of Environment and Agroclimatic  Studies
Department of Forestry and Mangrove Studies
Department of Wildlife Ecology
Department of Disaster Risk Management

Admission
From 2019, all agricultural university of Bangladesh conduct a cluster system admission tests where a single exam is taken for seven universities which provide education in the field of agricultural sciences: Bangabandhu Sheikh Mujibur Rahman Agricultural University, Bangladesh Agricultural University, Sher-e-Bangla Agricultural University, Chittagong Veterinary and Animal Sciences University, Sylhet Agricultural University, Khulna Agricultural University and Patuakhali Science and Technology University. The cluster system reduced students suffering and financial costs. Admission test is held on each campus but at a time with same question.

Undergraduate program
B.Sc. Agriculture(Hons.)
B.Sc. Vet Science and Animal Husbandry
Bachelor of Biomedical Science
B.Sc. Fisheries(Hons.)
B.Sc. Oceanography(Hons.)
B.Sc. Agricultural Economics(Hons.) 
B.Sc. Agricultural Engineering
B.Sc. Biocomputing Engineering
B.Sc. Food Engineering
B.Sc. Food Safety Management
Bachelor of Environmental Science(Hons.)
B.Sc. Disaster Management (Hons.)

References

External links
 
 Ministry of Agriculture
 Ministry of Fisheries and Livestock
 Ministry of Education
 University Grants Commission Bangladesh
 Ministry of Food
 Ministry of Science and Technology

Educational institutions established in 2019
2019 establishments in Bangladesh
Agricultural universities and colleges in Bangladesh
Education in Khulna